α-amino-3-hydroxy-5-methyl-4-isoxazolepropionic acid, better known as AMPA, is a compound that is a specific agonist for the AMPA receptor, where it mimics the effects of the neurotransmitter glutamate.

There are several types of glutamatergic ion channels in the central nervous system including AMPA, kainic acid and N-methyl-D-aspartic acid (NMDA) channels. In the synapse, these receptors serve very different purposes. AMPA can be used experimentally to distinguish the activity of one receptor from the other in order to understand their differing functions. AMPA generates fast excitatory postsynaptic potentials (EPSP). AMPA activates AMPA receptors that are non-selective cationic channels allowing the passage of Na+ and K+ and therefore have an equilibrium potential near 0 mV.

AMPA was first synthesized, along with several other ibotenic acid derivatives, by Krogsgaard-Larsen, Honoré, and others toward differentiating glutamate sensitive receptors from aspartate sensitive receptors.

See also
 Ampakine

References

AMPA receptor agonists
Kainate receptor agonists
Amino acids
Isoxazoles
Glutamate (neurotransmitter)